Shannon Birchard (born May 11, 1994) is a Canadian curler from Winnipeg, Manitoba. She currently plays second on Team Kerri Einarson from Gimli, Manitoba. Birchard also won the 2018 Scotties Tournament of Hearts with Jennifer Jones when she filled for Kaitlyn Lawes who was competing at the PyeongChang Olympics. She would win a world championship as the alternate member of the Jones team that same year when they won the event in North Bay in 2018. She has also won three Grand Slam of Curling events with the Einarson rink.

Career

Juniors
Birchard won two provincial junior championships in her junior career, in 2012 and 2013 as a skip. At the 2012 Canadian Junior Curling Championships, Birchard led her team of Selena Kaatz, Kristin MacCuish and Mariah Mondor to a 10-2 round robin record, giving her rink a bye to the finals, where she lost to Alberta's Jocelyn Peterman. At the 2013 Canadian Junior Curling Championships, she led her team of Nicole Sigvaldason, Sheyna Andries and Mondor to a 9–1 record before the playoffs. There, she won the semifinal game against Ontario's Jamie Sinclair before losing in the final to Corryn Brown's British Columbia rink. She was not able to defend her Manitoba title in 2014 or in 2015, when she lost in the final.

Women's
After failing to win a third provincial junior title, Birchard played in her first women's provincial championship (the Manitoba Scotties) in 2014 with Nicole Sigvaldason, Kelsey Boettcher and Megan Sigvaldason. The team finished the tournament with a 1–6 record.

Birchard returned to the Manitoba Scotties in 2016 with her 2013 junior team. There, she found more success, making the playoffs after posting a 6–1 record. In the playoffs she beat Cathy Overton-Clapham, but then lost in the semifinal to Kerri Einarson.

Her team played in the 2017 Manitoba Scotties Tournament of Hearts, again making the playoffs after winning a tiebreaker game after a 4–3 record. However, she would lose to Darcy Robertson in their only playoff game. Birchard won the Manitoba Mixed doubles title that year and played in the 2017 Canadian Mixed Doubles Curling Championship with partner Jason Gunnlaugson. They went 5–2 after group play, but were eliminated in the round of 12 against Marliese Kasner and Dustin Kalthoff.

Birchard and her team began the 2017–18 season by winning the 2017 Colonial Square Ladies Classic, after beating defending Olympic champion Jennifer Jones in the final. She played vice for Jones on Team Manitoba at the 2018 Scotties Tournament of Hearts, with Jones' regular vice Kaitlyn Lawes absent in preparation for the mixed doubles tournament of the 2018 Winter Olympics. They would go on to win the Scotties after defeating fellow Manitoban, Kerri Einarson in the final. After the win Birchard said that "It's pretty unbelievable. I don't even have words right now, I'm speechless. I'm so overjoyed and so happy that they chose me to come along. This has been a dream of mine for a really long time." With Lawes returning to the team following the Olympics, Birchard became the alternate for Team Canada at  the 2018 World Women's Curling Championship. In their matches against the Czech and Italian teams, Birchard had a chance to play in the second half, replacing Lawes and Jill Officer in each of their games well under control. She had a chance to play a full game, replacing Officer in their match against Japan. The team went undefeated through the whole tournament, winning the extra-end final against the reigning Olympic champions, Team Hasselborg of Sweden.

For the 2018–19 season, Birchard joined a new team with Kerri Einarson, Val Sweeting, and Briane Meilleur, all former skips. They began the season by winning three straight World Curling Tour events in three weeks: the 2018 Stu Sells Oakville Tankard, the inaugural Morris SunSpiel and then the Mother Club Fall Curling Classic with a fourth win at the Curlers Corner Autumn Gold Classic in October. In December, the team lost in the finals of the 2018 Canada Cup and 2018 National. Their strong play during the early part of the season earned them enough points to put team Einarson in the Wild Card game at the 2019 Scotties Tournament of Hearts. However the team lost to the lower ranked Casey Scheidegger rink. The team would rebound to have a strong finish at the end of the season, winning the 2019 Players' Championship and losing in the final of the 2019 Champions Cup.

Team Einarson had two playoff finishes at the first two Slams of the 2019–20 season, losing to Anna Hasselborg in the quarterfinal of the Masters and once again to Hasselborg in the final of the Tour Challenge. The team did not have the same success at the Canada Cup as they did in 2018, finishing with a 2–4 record. However, at the 2020 Manitoba Scotties Tournament of Hearts, her team succeeded. They finished the round robin and championship round with a 7–1 record which qualified them for the final. In the final, they defeated Jennifer Jones. It was Birchard's first Manitoba Scotties Tournament of Hearts provincial title. Team Einarson represented Manitoba at the 2020 Scotties Tournament of Hearts, where they continued their success. They finished first in the round robin with a 9–2 record and then won the 1 vs. 2 page playoff game, qualifying them for the final. Birchard would win her second Canadian Championship when they defeated Rachel Homan 8–7 in an extra end. Birchard was named the All-Star Second for the tournament. The team was set to represent Canada at the 2020 World Women's Curling Championship before the event got cancelled due to the COVID-19 pandemic. The Scotties would be their last event of the season as both the Players' Championship and the Champions Cup Grand Slam events were also cancelled due to the pandemic.

Team Einarson returned to the Scotties Tournament of Hearts in 2021 as Team Canada. They went 7–1 in the round robin, with their only loss coming against Ontario's Rachel Homan. This qualified them for the championship round. There, they won three games and lost one to Manitoba's Jennifer Jones. They advanced to the playoffs as the second seed, defeating Alberta's Laura Walker 9–3 in the semifinal. In the final, they defeated Homan to win their second consecutive Scotties gold. Birchard was named the First Team All-Star second for the second year in a row. A month later, Birchard was back in the Calgary bubble to compete with her mixed doubles partner Catlin Schneider at the 2021 Canadian Mixed Doubles Curling Championship. The pair qualified for the playoffs with a 4–2 record and defeated Emma Miskew and Ryan Fry in the round of 12. They then lost to Danielle Schmiemann and John Morris in the round of 8, eliminating them from contention. Birchard returned to the bubble for a third time in April 2021, along with her women's team to play in the two only Grand Slam events of the abbreviated season. The team made it to the semifinals of the 2021 Champions Cup where they lost to Team Homan, but got their revenge at the 2021 Players' Championship a week later, where they beat Homan in the final. The following week, Team Einarson represented Canada at the 2021 World Women's Curling Championship. The team had a slow start to the event, falling to 1–5 after their first six games. They turned things around, however, winning six of their seven remaining round robin games to qualifying for the playoffs. They then faced Sweden's Anna Hasselborg in the qualification game, which they lost 8–3.

The Einarson rink had a slow start to the 2021–22 season, failing to win any of their first five tour events. Their best finish came at the 2021 Sherwood Park Women's Curling Classic where they lost in the final to Tracy Fleury. The team reached the quarterfinals of the 2021 Masters, however, then missed the playoffs at the 2021 National. At the 2021 Canadian Olympic Curling Trials, the team went through the round robin with a 4–4 record. This earned them a spot in the first tiebreaker, where they defeated Casey Scheidegger 8–6. They then faced Krista McCarville in the second tiebreaker, where they lost 4–3 and were eliminated. The team's next event was the 2022 Scotties Tournament of Hearts in Thunder Bay, Ontario. Through the round robin, the defending Scotties champions posted a perfect 8–0 record, earning a spot in the playoffs. They then lost in the seeding round to New Brunswick's Andrea Crawford, meaning they would have to win three straight games to defend their championship title. In the playoffs, the team won the 3 vs. 4 page playoff against Team Fleury and then defeated New Brunswick's Crawford in the semifinal to reach the Scotties final where they would face Northern Ontario's McCarville rink. After controlling the entire game, Team Einarson sealed the victory with a steal of one in the tenth end. With the win, they became just the fourth team to win three consecutive Scotties titles. They then went on to represent Canada at the 2022 World Women's Curling Championship, where they faired much better than in 2021. The team finished the round robin tied for second place with a 9–3 record, however, due to their draw shot challenge, finished third overall. This placed them in the qualification game where they defeated Denmark's Madeleine Dupont to advance to the semifinal. There, they took on South Korea's Kim Eun-jung. After taking control in the seventh end, South Korea stole the ninth and tenth ends to hand the Canadian team a 9–6 loss. They were able to rebound in the bronze medal game with an 8–7 victory over Sweden's Anna Hasselborg. Team Einarson wrapped up their season at the final two Slams of the season. At the 2022 Players' Championship, they made it all the way to the final where they were defeated by the Hasselborg rink. At the 2022 Champions Cup, the team secured their fourth Grand Slam title as a foursome with a 10–6 victory over Gim Eun-ji.

Personal life
Birchard attended the University of Winnipeg. She is a self-employed bookkeeper and is engaged to Kellen Desmond.

Teams

References

External links

Living people
1994 births
Curlers from Winnipeg
University of Winnipeg alumni
Canadian women curlers
Canadian women's curling champions
World curling champions
Canada Cup (curling) participants